John Hutton may refer to:

Politicians
John Hutton (died 1596), MP for Cambridgeshire
John Hutton (1659–1731), British Member of Parliament for Richmond, 1701–1702
John Hutton (physician) (died 1712), Scottish physician and Member of Parliament
John E. Hutton (1828–1893), U.S. Representative from Missouri
Sir John Hutton (publisher) (1841–1903), publisher and chairman of the London County Council
John Hutton (Conservative politician) (1847–1921), British Conservative Member of Parliament for Richmond, 1895–1906
John Hutton, Baron Hutton of Furness (born 1955), former British Labour Member of Parliament for Barrow and Furness and Secretary of State for Defence

Sportsmen
Bouse Hutton (John Bower Hutton, 1877–1962), Canadian football fullback, and ice hockey and lacrosse goaltender
Jock Hutton (John Douglas Hutton, 1898–1970), Scottish footballer who played for Aberdeen, Blackburn Rovers and Scotland
John Hutton (cricketer) (born 1946), English  cricketer
John Hutton (footballer) (born 1966), Australian rules footballer with the Brisbane Bears and Fremantle Dockers

Others
John Hutton (artist) (1906–1978), famous for glass engravings at the Shakespeare Centre at Stratford upon Avon or at Coventry cathedral
John Hutton (author) (born 1928), British writer of crime and thriller novels
John Hutton (designer) (1947–2006), American designer
John Henry Hutton (1885–1968), professor of social anthropology at the University of Cambridge, 1937–1950
John Hutton (priest) (died 1712), English priest